Yeso Amalfi (6 December 1925 – 10 May 2014) was a Brazilian footballer who played as a striker.

References

External links
 
 Profile

1925 births
2014 deaths
Footballers from São Paulo
Brazilian footballers
Association football forwards
São Paulo FC players
Boca Juniors footballers
Peñarol players
Sociedade Esportiva Palmeiras players
OGC Nice players
Ligue 1 players
Torino F.C. players
Serie A players
AS Monaco FC players
Racing Club de France Football players
Red Star F.C. players
Olympique de Marseille players
Ligue 2 players
Argentine Primera División players
Brazilian expatriate footballers
Expatriate footballers in Argentina
Expatriate footballers in Uruguay
Expatriate footballers in France
Brazilian expatriate sportspeople in Monaco
Expatriate footballers in Monaco
Expatriate footballers in Italy